V for Victory: Market-Garden is 1993 computer wargame developed by Atomic Games and published by Three-Sixty Pacific. It is part of the V for Victory video game series.

Gameplay
The game covers Operation Market Garden and various actions by the units involved.

Development
The game was released for Mac computers in March 1993.

Reception
A 1993 survey of wargames in Computer Gaming World gave V for Victory III: Market Garden four stars. Another reviewer for the magazine criticized Market Garden as buggy and flawed.

Chris W. McCubbin reviewed V for Victory: Market Garden in Pyramid #4 (Nov./Dec., 1993), and stated that "V For Victory'''s sophistication is not easy to summarize in a nutshell. This game does so many things so effortlessly that it's impossible to list all its surprising capabilities in a review this size. My advice, if you have any interest at all in strategic computer games, is simply to check out V For Victory: Market Garden for yourself. I doubt you'll be disappointed."

In 1994, the editors of PC Gamer US wrote, "The V for Victory series is quite simply the most playable war games available, with an easy-to-master interface and admirable depth of game play." They continued, "We single out Utah Beach because it launched the series — but by all means, check out Velikiye Luki, Gold*Juno*Sword, and Market Garden, too."

The V for Victory series collectively won Computer Games Strategy Pluss 1992 "Game of the Year" award. The magazine's Brian Walker wrote that it "achieved what many computer wargames have been trying to do for years: successfully convert a board wargame onto computer." Computer Games'' likewise named it the year's best wargame.

Reviews
Computer Gaming World - Oct, 1993
Computer Gaming World - Aug, 1993

References

External links
Review in Compute!
Review in Electronic Games

1993 video games
Atomic Games games
Computer wargames
DOS games
Turn-based strategy video games
Video games developed in the United States
World War II video games